The Pink Boots Society (PBS) is a non-profit organization with international membership which supports women working in the brewing profession, especially in creating craft beer. The organization helps women brewers meet mentors, have the opportunity to network with other women in the profession and raises awareness of women in brewing. PBS also encourages women brewers to further their education and helps teach the skills needed to become beer judges. PBS raises money for scholarships for women to continue their education in brewing. There are around 1,800 members across the world. All members must be women and have some type of career in the brewing world or related to beer and beer-making.

Organization history 
The Pink Boots Society was inspired by a 2007 cross-country trip taken by Teri Fahrendorf, which she documented on her blog "The Road Brewer." Fahrendorf had recently left her position as head brewer at Steelhead in Eugene, Oregon, and wanted to connect with new people and learn about differences in regional brewing techniques. Armed with a pair of pink rubber boots, Fahrendorf set off for California in June 2007. Fahrendorf met other brewers, Laura Ulrich, Carol Stoudt, and Whitney Thompson while on a road trip.

She went to 70 different breweries and participated in 38 brews, which helped her realize that many of the women brewers she met didn't know there were other women in their profession, but wanted to connect with other women. The first manifestation of PBS was merely a list of women brewers maintained on Fahrendorf's blog. When the trip was finished, Fahrendorf had collected contact information for nearly 60 women who wanted to create and participate in a supportive professional community.

In 2008, Fahrendorf and 22 others met at the Craft Brewers Conference, where they decided to organize into an official organization; later, the Pink Boots Society became a non-profit organization. As a nod to the original pink boots given to Fahrendorf by her mother-in-law, they called it the Pink Boots Society. The mission was to provide education and mentoring to women, as well as to raise awareness of gender issues in the industry. The Pink Boots Society and its members have been involved in many major beer events, including the Great American Beer Festival, Craft Brewers' Conference, and World Brewing Conference. The Pink Boots Society has also developed their own annual events, such as Big Boots Brew, Bring Mom Out for a Beer, and the North Carolina chapters' Biere de Femme Festival. In 2013, PBS was contacted by Sophie de Ronde to create the International Women's Collaboration Brew Day (IWCBD). The day helps raise awareness about women in the brewing industry and also helps raise money for PBS.

In 2018, Yakima Chief Hops (YCH) created a special hop blend to benefit the Pink Boots Society. Proceeds from the Pink Boots Blend help fund the organization's scholarship fund. Working with its distribution partner, Country Malt Group, YCH contributed $117,807 this year; the program has raised over $257,000 for the Pink Boots Society since 2018.

Pink Boots Society raises money for scholarships each year for different causes.

Barley's Angels and consumer education 
As the Pink Boots Society grew, its identity as a professional organization and needs of professional members excluded consumers. However, recognizing that an educated female consumer base was valuable in overcoming gender stereotypes about taste and preference, in 2011 members created Barley's Angels, a branch of the organization that served as an educational and social community for female beer enthusiasts. In 2012, the Pink Boots Society became a 501(c)3 non-profit organization, which allowed them to raise funds and expand their educational scholarships; however, when they were granted non-profit status, they were required to split operations from the Barley's Angels, which supported for-profit businesses through its consumer education programs. Now both organizations run independently.

Staff and volunteers 
Emily Engdahl became the Executive Director in 2013, a position she held until 2018. Fahrendorf was President until 2016, when Laura Ulrich took over, but she continues to be involved with the organization with the title "President Emeritus". In 2021, Jen Jordan became the Board President.

Archival records 
The Pink Boots Society's archival collections are housed in the Oregon Hops and Brewing Archives (OHBA) at Oregon State University.  This collection helps document the creation, growth, administration, and members of the Pink Boots Society.

References

External links 
 Official site
 Pink Boots Society notes from 2014
Pink Boots Society Finding Aid in the Oregon State University Libraries

Women's organizations based in the United States
Brewing
American brewers